Boloria tritonia is a species of butterfly found in the East Palearctic that belongs to the Nymphalidae family.

Description
The hind wing underside ground colour is ochre-orange, the discal band evenly ochre or whitish-coloured, with a slight suffusion of dark scales. The general pattern is more bright and the  dark basal suffusion on hind wing upperside is less expressed than in related species and the male genitalia  are diagnostic.

Subspecies
B. t. tritonia — Baikal
B. t. amphilochus (Ménétriés, 1859) — Amur, Ussuri
B. t. barkalovi (Dubatolov, 2010)

Biology
The larva on feeds on Saxifraga bronchialis.

See also
List of butterflies of Europe

References

Boloria
Butterflies described in 1812